Katie Teresa Perkins (born 7 July 1988) is a New Zealand former cricketer who played as a right-handed batter. She appeared in 73 One Day Internationals and 55 Twenty20 Internationals for New Zealand between 2012 and 2020. She played domestic cricket for Auckland, as well as playing one match for Adelaide Strikers.

In 2013, she graduated as a police constable from the Royal New Zealand Police College.

Career
Perkins made her Women's T20 International cricket (WT20I) debut for New Zealand Women against Australia on 20 January 2012. Five days later, she made her Women's One Day International cricket (WODI) debut against the same team.

In August 2018, she was awarded a central contract by New Zealand Cricket, following the tours of Ireland and England in the previous months. In January 2020, she was named in New Zealand's squad for the 2020 ICC Women's T20 World Cup in Australia.

Perkins retired from all forms of cricket in February 2023.

References

External links
 
 

1988 births
Living people
Cricketers from Auckland
People educated at Westlake Girls High School
New Zealand women cricketers
New Zealand women One Day International cricketers
New Zealand women Twenty20 International cricketers
Auckland Hearts cricketers
Adelaide Strikers (WBBL) cricketers
People educated at Royal New Zealand Police College
New Zealand police officers